Provincial Road 457 (PR 457) is a provincial road in the southwest part of the Canadian province of Manitoba.

Route description 
Provincial Road 457 is an east-west route and runs from PR 340 near Douglas to its terminus at PTH 1A (1st Street North) in Brandon.

PR 457, along with PR 340, serves as the main connector route between Brandon and CFB Shilo. Because of this, and that it travels at a lower elevation than the Trans-Canada Highway, the road is known locally as the "Low Road to Shilo".

PR 457 is a paved road for its entire length.

References

External links 
Manitoba Official Map - Southwest
Official Highway Map of Manitoba - Brandon

457